"Lay It on Me" is a song recorded by Norwegian singer and songwriter Ina Wroldsen and Norwegian record producer duo Broiler. The song was released in April 2016 and has peaked at number 2 in Norway, where it was certified 2× platinum.

Reception
Scandipop said "It's an emotional ballad backed by an equally powerful production which complements the fraught fragility of the top-line beautifully".

Track listing

Weekly charts

Certifications

Release history

References

2016 songs
2016 singles
DJ Broiler songs
Ina Wroldsen songs
Songs written by Arnthor Birgisson
Songs written by Ina Wroldsen